Milton Carl "Milt" Fankhauser (29 October 1915 in New York City – 26 February 1970 in Santa Barbara, California) was an American racecar driver.

Indy 500 results

References

1915 births
1970 deaths
Indianapolis 500 drivers
Racing drivers from New York City